Riccardo Patrizio Tonetti (born 14 May 1989) is an Italian World Cup alpine ski racer.

World Cup results

Season standings

Top ten results
 0 podiums; 13 top tens (6 GS, 7 AC)

World Championships results

Olympic results

References

External links
 
Italian Winter Sports Federation – (FISI) – alpine skiing – Riccardo Tonetti – 

1989 births
Living people
Italian male alpine skiers
Alpine skiers at the 2018 Winter Olympics
Olympic alpine skiers of Italy
Sportspeople from Bolzano
Alpine skiers of Fiamme Gialle
20th-century Italian people
21st-century Italian people